{{DISPLAYTITLE:Lambda1 Fornacis}}

 
 

λ1 Fornacis, Latinized as Lambda1 Fornacis, is a red giant star in the southern constellation of Fornax. It is just visible to the naked eye as a dim, yellow-hued point of light with an apparent visual magnitude of 5.91.

λ1 Fornacis is a K-type giant star with a stellar classification of K0/1III, showing it has exhausted its core hydrogen and evolved away from the main sequence. It is currently on the horizontal branch, fusing helium in its core. The star has 2.3 times the mass of the Sun and 12 times its radius. The abundance of elements with mass higher than helium is similar to the Sun.

References

Fornax (constellation)
Fornacis, Lambda1
Durchmusterung objects
015975
011867
0744
K-type giants